James Earl Baumgartner (March 23, 1943 – December 28, 2011) was an American mathematician who worked in set theory, mathematical logic and foundations, and topology.

His advisor was Robert Vaught. He became a professor at Dartmouth College in 1969, and spent his entire career there.

One of Baumgartner's results is the consistency of the statement that any two -dense sets of reals are order isomorphic (a set of reals is -dense if it has exactly  points in every open interval). He died in 2011 of a heart attack at his home in Hanover, New Hampshire.

The mathematical context in which Baumgartner worked spans Suslin's problem, Ramsey theory, uncountable order types, disjoint refinements, almost disjoint families, cardinal arithmetics, filters, ideals, and partition relations, iterated forcing and Axiom A, proper forcing and the proper forcing axiom, chromatic number of graphs, a thin very-tall superatomic Boolean algebra, closed unbounded sets, and partition relations.

See also

Baumgartner's axiom

Selected publications 
 Baumgartner, James E., A new class of order types, Annals of Mathematical Logic, 9:187–222, 1976
 Baumgartner, James E., Ineffability properties of cardinals I, Infinite and Finite Sets, Keszthely (Hungary) 1973, volume 10 of Colloquia Mathematica Societatis János Bolyai, pages 109–130. North-Holland, 1975
 Baumgartner, James E.; Harrington, Leo; Kleinberg, Eugene, Adding a closed unbounded set,  Journal of Symbolic Logic, 41(2):481–482, 1976
 Baumgartner, James E., Ineffability properties of cardinals II, Robert E. Butts and Jaakko Hintikka, editors, Logic, Foundations of Mathematics and Computability Theory, pages 87–106. Reidel, 1977
 Baumgartner, James E.;  Galvin, Fred, Generalized Erdős cardinals and 0#, Annals of Mathematical Logic 15, 289–313, 1978
 Baumgartner, James E.; Erdős, Paul; Galvin, Fred; Larson, J., Colorful partitions of cardinal numbers, Can. J. Math. 31, 524–541, 1979
 Baumgartner, James E.; Erdős, Paul; Higgs, D., Cross-cuts in the power set of an infinite set, Order 1, 139–145, 1984
 Baumgartner, James E. (Editor), Axiomatic Set Theory (Contemporary Mathematics, Volume 31), 1990

References

 

1943 births
20th-century American mathematicians
21st-century American mathematicians
American logicians
Set theorists
Mathematical logicians
University of California, Berkeley alumni
Dartmouth College faculty
2011 deaths
People from Wichita, Kansas
Mathematicians from Kansas